Mount Judd is a prominent bare rock mountain, over  high, surmounting the ridge running north from Mount White in the Supporters Range in Antarctica. It was named by the Advisory Committee on Antarctic Names for Robert C. Judd, a  United States Antarctic Research Program meteorologist at South Pole Station, winter 1964, and Hallett Station, 1964–65 summer season.

References

Mountains of the Ross Dependency
Dufek Coast